The 2007 Houston Texans season was the franchise's 6th season in the National Football League and the 2nd  under head coach Gary Kubiak. The Texans improved upon their 6–10 record from the previous, finishing the season at 8–8 for the franchise's first non-losing season.

Offseason

The offseason was dominated by rumors and speculation surrounding the future of David Carr and the Texans. Jake Plummer was a leading candidate to replace Carr until he was traded to Tampa Bay and then retired. The Texans also contacted free agent Jeff Garcia before he signed with Tampa Bay. Finally, on March 21 the Texans struck a deal with Atlanta and traded draft picks for their backup quarterback, Matt Schaub. Carr was cut on March 23 and later signed by the Carolina Panthers.

Another situation of great speculation to fans was that of Domanick Williams. Williams, the Texans all-time leading rusher, had a lingering knee injury that kept him side-lined for the entirety of the 2006 season. The Texans signed Ahman Green during free agency and eventually released Williams on March 23, 2007.

Player Additions/Subtractions 

Additions: 
RB Ahman Green
LB Danny Clark
SS Michael Boulware
OT Jordan Black
DT Jeff Zgonina
LB Shawn Barber
QB Matt Schaub
CB Jamar Fletcher
WR André Davis

Subtractions: 
 DE Antwan Peek
 WR Eric Moulds
 DE Jason Babin
 DT Seth Payne
 OT Zach Wiegert
 CB Lewis Sanders
 RB Domanick Williams
 QB David Carr
 LB Troy Evans
 FS Michael Stone
 LB Kailee Wong

Draft

The Texans swapped their first-round pick in the 2007 NFL Draft (8th overall) with the Atlanta Falcons for their first-round pick (10th overall) as part of the Matt Schaub deal. In drafting Okoye, who was 19 at the time of the draft, the Texans took the youngest player in NFL Draft history. Okoye ended up being a "bust"; the pick immediately after was 7x Pro Bowler Patrick Willis, who was chosen by the San Francisco 49ers.

The Texans also traded their second-round selections in 2007 and 2008 as part of the Schaub deal and did not choose again until the third round, when they took Jacoby Jones from Division II Lane College, the highest picked player who did not play in Division I FBS or FCS that year.

Guard Kasey Studdard (6th round) became the second Texas Longhorns player drafted by the Texans (Sloan Thomas was taken in the 7th round in 2004).

Undrafted free agents

Staff

Roster

Preseason

Regular season

Schedule

Note: Intra-division opponents are in bold text.

Standings

Game summaries

Week 1: vs. Kansas City Chiefs

The Texans began their 2007 campaign at home against the Kansas City Chiefs.  After a scoreless first quarter, Houston came out pounding in the second quarter with kicker Kris Brown getting a 26-yard field goal, while QB Matt Schaub completed a 77-yard touchdown pass to WR Andre Johnson.  In the third quarter, DE Mario Williams showed his reason for being last year's #1 overall pick by returning a fumble 38 yards for a touchdown.  Afterwards, the Chiefs got their only score of the game with kicker Justin Medlock nailing a 27-yard field goal.  In the fourth quarter, the Texans sealed the victory with Brown kicking a 28-yard field goal.

Matt Schaub, in his Texans debut, went 16 of 22 for 225 yards with 1 touchdown and 1 interception.

With the win, Houston began their season at 1–0.

Week 2: at Carolina Panthers

Following their home win over the Chiefs, the Texans flew to Bank of America Stadium for their Week 2 match-up against the Carolina Panthers.  In the first quarter, Houston trailed early as QB Jake Delhomme hooked up with WR Steve Smith for a 7-yard and a 12-yard TD pass.  Houston responded with QB Matt Schaub completing a 31-yard TD pass to WR Andre Johnson.  In the second quarter, Schaub and Johnson hooked up with each other again on a 9-yard TD pass.  The Texans took the lead prior to halftime with kicker Kris Brown getting a 25-yard field goal.

In the third quarter, Houston increased its lead with RB Ahman Green getting a 13-yard TD run.  On the following kickoff, Panthers FB Nick Goings fumbled the ball, causing it to roll into Carolina's end zone, where WR Kevin Walter landed on it for a touchdown, giving a huge momentum swing towards the Texans.  In the fourth quarter, Houston put the out the game out of reach with Brown kicking a 33-yard field goal.  The Panthers mustered up one last score as Delhomme completed a pass to Smith, who broke off many Texans defenders and ran 74 yards for a touchdown.  In the end, Houston held on to win.

With the win, not only did the Texans begin their season at 2–0 for the first time in franchise history, but their 34 points in one game also became a franchise record.

Week 3: vs. Indianapolis Colts

Following an impressive win over the Panthers, the Texans went home for an AFC South duel with the defending Super Bowl champions, the Indianapolis Colts (who Houston won against last time at home).  In the first quarter, the Texans delivered the first punch with WR Jerome Mathis returning a kickoff 84 yards for a touchdown.  However, the Colts responded with QB Peyton Manning completing a 2-yard TD pass to TE Dallas Clark.  In the second quarter, Houston retook the lead with kicker Kris Brown getting a 33-yard field goal.  However, Indianapolis went ahead with RB Joseph Addais 4-yard TD run.

In the third quarter, the Colts managed to put the Texans in a huge hole with kicker Adam Vinatieri's 36-yard field goal, Addai's 8-yard TD run, and Vinatieri's 28-yard field goal.  In the fourth quarter, Houston tried a comeback with RB Samkon Gado's 1-yard TD run.  Indianapolis got their final score of the game with Vinatieri kicking a 35-yard field goal.  The Texans drew close with QB Matt Schaub's 1-yard TD pass to RB Vonta Leach.  However, the Colts managed to hold on to win.

With the loss, Houston fell to 2–1.

Week 4: at Atlanta Falcons

Hoping to rebound from their divisional home loss to the Colts, the Texans flew to the Georgia Dome for an interconference battle with the winless Atlanta Falcons, where QB Matt Schaub fought against his former team.

In the first quarter, Houston trailed early as Falcons kicker Morten Andersen nailed a 28-yard field goal.  The Texans managed to take the lead with Schaub completing a 35-yard TD pass to WR André Davis.  However, Atlanta regained the lead with QB Joey Harrington completing a 5-yard TD pass to WR Michael Jenkins  In the second quarter, Houston's current woes continued with Harrington and Jenkins hooking up with each other again as 7-yard TD pass, along with Andersen kicking a 22-yard field goal.  The Texans got their only score of the period with kicker Kris Brown nailing a 42-yard field goal.

In the third quarter, Houston kept closer with a 37-yard field goal, but the Falcons eventually responded with Andersen kicking a 36-yard field goal.  In the fourth quarter, the Texans again crept closer with Brown getting a 19-yard field.  Yet again, Atlanta replied with Andersen kicking a 46-yard field goal.  Afterwards, the Falcons held on to get their first win of the year.

With their second-straight loss, the Texans fell to 2–2.

Week 5: vs. Miami Dolphins

Trying to snap a two-game losing streak, the Texans returned home for a Week 5 duel with the winless Miami Dolphins.  In the first quarter, Houston took the early lead with RB Ron Dayne getting a 1-yard TD run.  However, the Dolphin answered with kicker Jay Feely getting a 23-yard field goal, along with RB Ronnie Brown getting a 3-yard TD run.  In the second quarter, the Texans' recent struggles continued as Miami managed to get 40-yard and a 33-yard field goal from Feely.  The Texans ended the half with kicker Kris Brown getting a 54-yard field goal.

In the third quarter, Houston began to retaliate with Brown nailing a 43-yard and a 54-yard field goal.  In the fourth quarter, the Dolphins managed to get a 48-yard field goal. The Texans snapped their two-game skid with Brown making field goals from 20 and 57 yards.

With the win, the Texans improved to 3–2.

Week 6: at Jacksonville Jaguars

Coming off their home win over the Dolphins, the Texans flew to Jacksonville Municipal Stadium for a Week 6 AFC South showdown with the Jacksonville Jaguars.  In the first quarter, Houston struck first with kicker Kris Brown getting a 20-yard field goal for the only score of the period.  In the second quarter, the Texans increased its lead with Brown kicking a 35-yard field goal.  However, the Jaguars took the lead with QB David Garrard completing a 1-yard TD pass to TE George Wrighster, along with kicker John Carney getting a 37-yard field goal.

In the third quarter, Houston continued to trail as Garrard completed a 9-yard TD pass to WR Reggie Williams (with a blocked PAT).  The Texans responded with Brown getting a 33-yard field goal.  However, in the fourth quarter, Jacksonville pulled away with RB Maurice Jones-Drew getting a 7-yard TD run, LB Daryl Smith returning a fumble 77 yards for a touchdown, and Jones-Drew getting a 57-yard TD run.   Houston's only response was back-up QB Sage Rosenfels completing a 1-yard TD pass to FB Vonta Leach.

With the loss, the Texans fell to 3–3.

So far this year, Houston is 1–3 without WR Andre Johnson, who was still recovering from injuries.

Week 7: vs. Tennessee Titans

Hoping to rebound from their divisional road loss to the Jaguars, the Texans went home for a Week 7 AFC South showdown with the Tennessee Titans.  In the first quarter, the Titans struck first with kicker Rob Bironas getting a 52-yard field goal.  Houston responded with LB DeMeco Ryans returning a fumble 26 yards for a touchdown.  However, Tennessee answered with Bironas getting a 25-yard field goal.  In the second quarter, Houston began to struggle as the Titans increased its lead with Bironas kicking a 21-yard field goal, RB LenDale White getting a 1-yard TD run, and even Bironas with a 30-yard and a 28-yard field goal.

In the third quarter, the Texans continued to struggle as Bironas gave Tennessee a 43-yard field goal, while RB Chris Henry got a 4-yard TD run.  However, in the fourth quarter, Houston began to fight back.  It began with QB Sage Rosenfels completing a 7-yard TD pass to WR David Anderson.  It continued with Rosenfels' 6-yard TD pass to WR Kevin Walter.  The Titans got a 29-yard field goal by Bironas.  Afterwards, the Texans continued its comeback with Rosenfels completing a 7-yard TD pass to TE Jeb Putzier and a 53-yard TD pass to WR André Davis.  Tennessee got the last-second win as Bironas barely made a 29-yard field goal, making him the first kicker in NFL history to get 8 field goals in one game.

With their second-straight loss, Houston fell to 3–4.

Week 8: at San Diego Chargers

Trying to snap a two-game skid, the Texans flew to Qualcomm Stadium for a Week 8 intraconference game against the San Diego Chargers.  In the first quarter, Houston's recent struggles continued as Chargers QB Philip Rivers completed a 49-yard TD pass to TE Antonio Gates.  Later, a goof-up on special teams led to more points as a high punt snap went into the end zone.  Punter Matt Turk was unable to fall on the ball and San Diego CB Antonio Cromartie managed to recover it for a touchdown.  In the second quarter, the Texans got on the board with kicker Kris Brown nailing a 40-yard field goal.  However, the Chargers continued their beatdown with Rivers and Gates hooking up again on a 31-yard TD pass.  Later, San Diego increased its lead with Cromartie returning an interception 70 yards for a touchdown, along with Rivers completing a 14-yard TD pass to WR Chris Chambers.

After a scoreless third quarter, Houston tried to come back, as QB Sage Rosenfels completed a 28-yard TD to TE Joel Dreessen in the fourth quarter.  That was as close to the Chargers as they got.

With their third-straight loss, the Texans fell to 3–5.

Starting QB Matt Schaub (11/18 for 77 yards and 2 interceptions) left the game in the second quarter with a concussion, after getting a late hit from San Diego CB Drayton Florence.

The team is now 1–5 without WR Andre Johnson.

Week 9: at Oakland Raiders

Trying to snap a three-game skid, the Texans flew to McAfee Coliseum for a Week 9 intraconference duel with the Oakland Raiders.  With QB Matt Schaub out with a concussion, back-up QB Sage Rosenfels got the start.

In the first quarter, Houston drew first blood as RB Ahman Green got an 8-yard TD run for the only score of the period.  In the second quarter, the Texans continued to roll over the Raiders as RB Ron Dayne got a 14-yard TD run, while kicker Kris Brown nailed a 40-yard field goal.  In the third quarter, Oakland finally managed to respond as kicker Sebastian Janikowski managed to get a 22-yard field goal for the only score of the period.  In the fourth quarter, the Raiders drew closer as RB Justin Fargas got a 1-yard TD run.  Houston took control with Rosenfels completing a 42-yard TD pass to WR André Davis.  Oakland's only response was QB Josh McCown completing a 28-yard TD pass to WR Tim Dwight.

With their three-game skid snapped, the Texans entered their bye week at 4–5.

The win also kept Houston unbeaten (3–0) against the Raiders.

Week 11: vs. New Orleans Saints

Coming off their bye week, the Texans were at home for a Week 11 interconference duel with the New Orleans Saints.  In the first quarter, Houston trailed early as Saints kicker Olindo Mare completed a 52-yard field goal.  The Texans responded with QB Matt Schaub completing a 73-yard TD pass to WR Andre Johnson.  In the second quarter, New Orleans regained the lead with QB Drew Brees completing a 6-yard TD pass to WR Devery Henderson.  Houston replied with Schaub completing a 10-yard TD pass to TE Joel Dreesen, along with kicker Kris Brown getting a 36-yard field goal.

After a scoreless third quarter, the Texans took control in the fourth quarter as Brown nailed a 53-yard and a 23-yard field goal.

With the win, the Texans (for the first time in franchise history) improved to 5–5.

Andre Johnson, in his first game back from injuries, had an impressive day with 6 receptions for 120 yards and 1 touchdown.

DE Mario Williams had a big game, as he had 6 tackles, a sack, and a forced fumble.

Week 12: at Cleveland Browns

Coming off their home win over the Saints, the Texans flew to Cleveland Browns Stadium for a Week 12 duel with the Cleveland Browns.  In the first quarter, Houston shot first as QB Matt Schaub completed a 17-yard TD pass to WR Kevin Walter for the only score of the period.  In the second quarter, the Browns got on the board as QB Derek Anderson completed a 19-yard TD pass to WR Braylon Edwards.  The Texans regained the lead as kicker Kris Brown managed to get a 41-yard field goal.  However, Cleveland took the lead again as Anderson completed a 7-yard TD pass to TE Kellen Winslow.

In the third quarter, Houston started to fall behind as Browns kicker Phil Dawson managed to get a 25-yard field goal for the only score of the period.  In the fourth quarter, Cleveland sealed the win with Dawson nailing a 27-yard field goal and RB Jamal Lewis getting a 1-yard TD run.  The Texans' only response was be Schaub's 6-yard TD pass to TE Owen Daniels.

With the loss, Houston fell to 5–6.

The Browns defense managed to hold Andre Johnson to a season-low 3 receptions for 37 yards.

Week 13: at Tennessee Titans

Hoping ro rebound from their road loss to the Browns, the Texans flew to LP Field for a Week 13 AFC South rematch with the Tennessee Titans.  In the first quarter, Houston got the first punch as RB Ron Dayne got a 1-yard TD run.  The Titans responded with RB LenDale White getting a 1-yard TD run.  In the second quarter, Houston regained the lead with kicker Kris Brown getting a 45-yard field goal for the only score of the period.

In the third quarter, the Tennessee took the lead with QB Vince Young completing a 43-yard TD pass to WR Roydell Williams, along with an 11-yard TD pass to WR Justin Gage.  In the fourth quarter, the Texans tried to get a comeback as QB Sage Rosenfels completed a 28-yard TD pass to WR Andre Johnson, yet the Titans responded with RB Chris Brown getting a 7-yard TD run.  Houston tried to come back and take the lead, but their only response was Browns' 50-yard field goal.

With the loss, the Texans fell to 5–7.  They have now lost 7 out of their last 8 divisional road games.

QB Matt Schaub (3/5 for 34 yards) was knocked out of the game in the first quarter with a left shoulder injury.

Week 14: vs. Tampa Bay Buccaneers

Trying to snap a two-game losing skid, the Texans went home for a Week 14 interconference duel with the Tampa Bay Buccaneers.  In the first quarter, Houston drew first blood as QB Sage Rosenfels completed a 4-yard TD pass to WR Andre Johnson for the only score of the period.  In the second quarter, the Buccaneers got on the board with RB Earnest Graham getting a 4-yard TD run.  Afterwards, Houston answered with Rosenfels completing an 8-yard TD pass to WR Kevin Walter.

In the third quarter, the Texans immediately increased their lead as WR André Davis returned the half's opening kickoff 97 yards for a touchdown.  Tampa Bay responded with Graham getting an 11-yard TD run.  In the fourth quarter, Houston ended the game with Rosenfels completing a 4-yard TD pass to TE Owen Daniels.

With the win, the Texans improved to 6–7.

For DE Mario Williams (the 1st pick of last year's draft), his 1 sack in the game increased his season total to a franchise-best 9.5 sacks.

Week 15: vs. Denver Broncos

Coming off their impressive home win over the Buccaneers, the Texans stayed at home, donned their battle red alternates, and played a Thursday night intraconference duel with the Denver Broncos as head coach Gary Kubiak faced his former team.  In the first quarter, Houston drew first blood as QB Sage Rosenfels got a 5-yard TD run for the only score of the period.  In the second quarter, the Broncos got on the board with kicker Jason Elam getting a 41-yard field goal.  Afterwards, the Texans responded with kicker Kris Brown getting a 41-yard field goal.  Denver ended the half as Elam nailed a 47-yard field goal.

In the third quarter, Houston replied with RB Ron Dayne getting a 6-yard TD run.  Denver answered with QB Jay Cutler completing a 12-yard TD pass to TE Tony Scheffler.  In the fourth quarter, the Texans pulled away as Rosenfels completed a 4-yard TD pass to WR Andre Johnson, while FB Vonta Leach managed to get a 1-yard TD run.

With the win, Houston improved to 7–7. The game marked the only appearance of the Texans on primetime television of the season, their first since 2005, and the first game in 2007 played with the roof open.

Week 16: at Indianapolis Colts

Coming off an impressive blowout of the Denver Broncos, the Texans packed up and traveled to Indianapolis to do battle with their division rival. Houston drew first blood with as QB Sage Rosenfels threw a 17-yard TD pass to Kevin Walter. The Colts responded to the TD with a 29-yard Vinatieri field goal. The Colts, who got off to a slow start in the 1st Quarter, scored three touchdowns in the 2nd quarter, a 2-yard TD run by Joseph Addai and two Peyton Manning TD passes to tight end Dallas Clark. In the 3rd quarter, the Colts continued to pull away from the struggling Texans. Clifton Dawson scored a 4-yard TD Run and Manning passed to Reggie Wayne for a 7-yard TD. In the 4th quarter, the Colts put in backups and QB Sage Rosenfels threw a 6-yard TD to Andre Johnson and Darius Walker rushed up the middle for the 2-Point Conversion. The Texans fell 38–15, ending their 2-game win streak and hopes for their first winning season.

With the loss, the Texans fell to 7–8.

Week 17: vs. Jacksonville Jaguars

Hoping to end their season on a high note, the Texans went home and played a Week 17 AFC South rematch with the Jacksonville Jaguars (who were playing mainly with backups, due to them already clinching a playoff berth).

In the first quarter, Houston trailed early as QB Quinn Gray completed a 22-yard TD pass to WR Reggie Williams for the only score of the period.  In the second quarter, the Texans took the lead with RB Ron Dayne getting a 2-yard TD run and QB Sage Rosenfels completing a 2-yard TD pass to TE Owen Daniels.  Jacksonville tied the game with Gray completing a 6-yard TD pass to WR Ernest Wilford.  Afterwards, Houston immediately responded with WR André Davis returning a kickoff 97 yards for a touchdown.

In the third quarter, the Texans increased their lead as Davis returned the second half's opening kickoff 104 yards for a touchdown.  In doing so, Davis became the 7th player in NFL history to return two kickoffs for touchdowns in the same game.  Afterwards, Houston kept its momentum going with Dayne getting a 12-yard TD run.  The Jaguars responded with Gray completing a 5-yard TD pass to WR Matt Jones.  In the fourth quarter, the Texans pulled away with RB Darius Walker getting a 1-yard TD run.  Jacksonville ended the game with Gray and Wilford hooking up with each other again on a 17-yard TD pass.

With the win, Houston finished its season at 8–8.

For the year, the Texans scored a total of 43 touchdowns and managed to get 8 wins on the year (both franchise records).

Statistics

Team

Individual

Source:

References

Houston Texans seasons
Houston